Clement Charlton Palmer (1871–1944) was a cathedral organist, who served at Canterbury Cathedral.

Background

Clement Charlton Palmer was born on 26 April 1871 in Barton-under-Needwood in Staffordshire. His father, Dr. Clement Palmer, was the local general practitioner.

He was educated at the Derby School of Music and at Repton School.

He was a composer. His compositions include a morning and evening service in E flat, an evening service in F minor, morning and evening service in F for men's voices, Casabianca ballad for chorus and orchestra.

His best known works for solo organ are the three sets of twelve "Studies on Old English Hymn Tunes".

He also wrote at least two chamber works:  a trio for piano, violin and cello dated 1905, and a quartet for piano, flute, horn and bassoon.

Career

Assistant organist of:
Lichfield Cathedral 1890–1897

Organist of:
St Leonard's Church, Wychnor 1887
St Andrew's Church, Pau, France 1888–1890
Holy Trinity Church, Burton upon Trent 1891–1897
St Laurence Church, Ludlow 1897–1908
Canterbury Cathedral 1908–1936

References

English classical organists
British male organists
Cathedral organists
1871 births
1944 deaths
People educated at Repton School
People from Barton-under-Needwood
Male classical organists